The Lye Brook Wilderness is one of eight wilderness areas in the Green Mountain National Forest in the U.S. state of Vermont. It is managed by the U.S. Forest Service. The wilderness area was created by the Eastern Wilderness Areas Act of 1975, which makes it one of the oldest wilderness areas in the state. The area was expanded by both the Vermont Wilderness Act of 1984 and the New England Wilderness Act of 2006.

It is named after Lye Brook, which flows through the western half of the wilderness.

The Long Trail enters the wilderness area at Stratton Pond, crossing its eastern flank from south to north. The wilderness is traversed by several other hiking trails including the Branch Pond Trail and the Lye Brook Trail.

Approximately 80% of Lye Brook Wilderness is forested with northern hardwoods such as birch, beech, and maple trees, though some thickets of small spruce dot the area as well. A variety of wildlife inhabit the area, including black bear, moose, deer, pine marten, bobcat, and various bird species. Hikers have observed over 80 species of animals, plants, and fungi.

See also

 List of largest wilderness areas in the United States
 List of wilderness areas of the United States
 National Wilderness Preservation System
 Wilderness Act

References

External links
 VermontWilderness.org

Wilderness areas of Vermont
Stratton, Vermont
Protected areas of Bennington County, Vermont
Protected areas of Windham County, Vermont
Green Mountain National Forest
Protected areas established in 1975
1975 establishments in Vermont